Wolmirstedt is a town in the Börde district in Saxony-Anhalt, Germany. It is located 14 km north of Magdeburg, on the river Ohre. The town Wolmirstedt consists of Wolmirstedt proper and the Ortschaften (municipal divisions) Elbeu, Farsleben, Glindenberg and Mose.

History

1009 first documentary mention
1274 Ruthger von Blumenthal appointed Vogt of Wolmirstedt
1348 the Emperor Charles IV stays in the town; issues decree releasing the burghers of Pritzwalk, Havelberg, Perleberg and Kyritz from their feudal duty to Louis of Bavaria.
1475 Dietrich von Quitzow's men raid the town.
1590 municipal law
heavy destruction in the Thirty Years' War

Wolmirstedt was district town of the Wolmirstedt District until 1994, when the districts Haldensleben and Wolmirstedt were united to form the Ohrekreis, with the seat of district administration in Haldensleben. In 2007, the Ohrekreis was merged with the Bördekreis district to form the Börde district.

Sights
 Historical town centre
 Castle and historical castle church (northern brick gothic)

Infrastructure
In Wolmirstedt there is a large substation for 380kV. On the area of this transformer an HVDC back-to-back station with a transmission rate of 600 megawatts was planned, but this plan was canceled after the German reunification in 1990, because it was decided to synchronize electricity mains of East and West Germany. The 380kV line running from the transformer station Wolmirstedt to the shut-down nuclear power station Lubmin is the longest power line in Germany.

Transport
 Near Wolmirstedt the Mittellandkanal traverses the Elbe.
 The city can be reached by means of the exit Magdeburg-center of the federal motorway A 2 as well as the federal highway 189.

Sons and daughters of the city 

 Anne Catherine of Brandenburg (1575–1612), Queen of Denmark
 Christian Wilhelm of Brandenburg (1587–1665), Markgraf
 Siegmund Jakob Baumgarten (1706–1757), the theologian at the Friedrichs-University Halle
 Friedrich Schrader (1865–1922), journalist and writer
 Hans Schmidt (1877–1953), theologian
 Gerd Domhardt (1945–1997), composer
 Steffen Wesemann (born 1971), cyclist
 Carlo Westphal (born 1985), cyclist

References

Börde (district)